John Purnell D.D. was an English academic administrator at the University of Oxford.

Between 1716 and 1726 Purnell was Consul acting for the Levant Company at Aleppo.  Purnell was elected Warden (head) of New College, Oxford, in 1740, a post he held until 1764.
During his time as Warden of New College, he was also Vice-Chancellor of Oxford University from 1747 until 1750.

References

Year of birth missing
Year of death missing
Wardens of New College, Oxford
Vice-Chancellors of the University of Oxford